Reita Faria Powell (née Faria; born 23 August 1943) is an Indian physician, former model and the winner of the Miss World 1966 pageant. Born in Bombay to Goan parents, Faria is the first Asian woman to win the beauty contest. She is also the first Miss World winner to be qualified as a physician.

Personal life
Faria currently lives in Dublin, Ireland, with her husband, endocrinologist David Powell, whom she married in 1971. She has two daughters.

Career
Faria was born in Bombay. Soon after winning the Miss Bombay Crown, she won the Eve's Weekly Miss India contest 1966 competition (not to be confused with the Femina Miss India, won by Yasmin Daji).

During the Miss World 1966 contest, she won the sub-titles 'Best in Swimsuit' and 'Best in Eveningwear' for wearing a saree. She eventually went on to win the Miss World 1966 crown at the climax of the event, beating 51 competing delegates from other countries.

After her one-year tenure as Miss World, she began receiving various offers to act in films. Faria refused lucrative modelling and acting contracts, and instead concentrated on medical studies. She was a student at the Grant Medical College & Sir J. J. Group of Hospitals, where she completed her M.B.B.S. degree. Thereafter she went on to study at King's College Hospital, London. She married her mentor David Powell, in 1971, and in 1973, the couple shifted to Dublin, where she started her medical practice.

Reita was a judge at Femina Miss India in 1998, and has come back to judge the Miss World competition on a few occasions. She was a judge along with Demis Roussos at the Miss World final of 1976 held in London where Cindy Breakespeare was crowned Miss World.

See also
Yasmin Daji
Femina Miss India

References

External links 
Article Title
http://www.missworld.com

Medical doctors from Mumbai
Medical doctors from Goa
Femina Miss India winners
Miss World winners
Miss World 1966 delegates
Living people
1943 births
Indian beauty pageant winners
Indian emigrants to Ireland
Indian women medical doctors
20th-century Indian women scientists
20th-century Indian medical doctors
University of Mumbai alumni
Alumni of King's College London
Women scientists from Goa
Female models from Goa
20th-century women physicians
United Service Organizations entertainers